Ogo Nirupoma is an Indian Bengali language romantic drama television series which was premiered on 5 October 2020 on Bengali Entertainment Channel Star Jalsha and ended on 1 August 2021. It is also available on Disney+ Hotstar even before telecast. The show is produced by Acropoliis Entertainment and it stars Arkoja Acharya and Gourab Roy Choudhury in lead roles. It is the remake of Asianet's Malayalam show Kasthooriman

Plot 
The story follows Abir and Nirupama. Abir is a handsome and successful businessman  and managing director of 'Mohini's Beauty World'- a renowned cosmetics company, whereas Nirupama is a bank employee who is not a good looking woman. The story focuses on the importance of one's character and quality, and not the superficial.

Cast

Main
 Arkoja Acharya as Nirupama Roychowdhury (née Dutta) aka Rupu / Sanjukta Roychowdhury- an ugly looking woman who was kind-hearted, a former bank employee and a model (as Sanjukta), Abir's wife
 Gourab Roy Chowdhury as Abir Roychowdhury / Prithviraj- Nirupoma's husband; a businessman, M.D. of Mohini's Beauty World, a renowned cosmetics company, a singer. He was a man who judges a book by its cover (i.e. judges a woman by her looks, not by her heart).

Recurring
 Tulika Bose as Mohini Roychowdhury- Shalini's twin younger sister, Supratim's second wife, Abir's step mother, Mainak, Ena and Rishab mother; a former model; a greedy and corrupt businesswoman / Shalini Roychowdhury- Mohini's twin elder sister, Abir's biological mother, Supratim's first and estranged wife, a kind-hearted businesswoman who was her sister's opposite
 Arghya Mukherjee as Supratim Roychowdhury- Abir's father; a retired businessman; Shalini and Mohini's husband, Nayana's elder son.
 Anuradha Roy as Nayana Roychowdhury- Abir's grandmother; Supratim and Sudip's mother
 Mainak Dhole as Mainak Roychowdhury- Abir's youngest half-brother; Urmi's husband (as they reconciles at last); Kajal's fake husband
 Ujani Dasgupta as Prerona Roychowdhury- Rishab's wife; Kajal's elder sister
 Pritam Das as Rishav Roychowdhury- Abir's younger half-brother; Prerona's husband
 Prarona Bhattacharya as Sneha Roychowdhury- Abir's aunt, Sudip's wife
 Subhrajit Dutta as Sudip Roychowdhury- Abir's uncle, Sneha's husband, Nayana's younger son.
 Sneha Bose as Kajal- Abir's former girlfriend; Mainak's fake wife, Nirupoma's appointed model of Mohini's Beauty World.
 Priyanka Chakraborty as Ena Roychowdhury- Abir's half-sister; Harry's ex-girlfriend; Arup's wife.
 Tanuka Chatterjee as Bijaya Dutta- Nirupoma's mother
 Bikash Bhowmik as Nirmal Dutta- Nirupoma's father
 Soumi Ghosh as Urmimala Roychowdhury (née Dutta) / Urmi - a greedy girl; Nirupoma's sister; Abir's ex-fiancée; Mainak's wife
 Dipayan Mukherjee as Anuj- Nirupoma's brother
 Poushmita Goswami as Deepa- Nirupama's Aunt
 Sharbani Chatterjee as Bela - Mohini's cunning friend turned enemy
 Prosun Saha as Sishir- Abir's friend; Piya's love-interest
 Purbasha Debnath as Piya- Nirupoma's close friend and colleague; Shishir's love-interest
 Anujit Sarkar as Harry- Ena's boyfriend
 Manoj Ojha as Arup- Nirupoma's friend who likes her despite her looks; Ena's husband
 Moumita Chakraborty as Arup's mother

Adaptations

References 

Star Jalsha original programming
Bengali-language television programming in India
2020 Indian television series debuts
2021 Indian television series endings